The third and last season of animated series "The Dukes Of Broxstonia" first broadcast on ABC3 Australia on 15 April 2013 and ended on 26 April 2013. It contains 10 episodes of 7 minutes which include two 3 minute episodes, Broxstonian advertisements for products like stinky breath mints and extra-strong hair gel and other shorts. The third series is also available as 3 minute episodes only. The "Mojo" episode was selected for the Annecy Animation Festival 2013, in 1080i HD format. The season began with "Fly" and ended with "Dukes in Space".

The Dukes of Bröxstônia received the Children's Television Production of the Year Award at the 2013 Screen Producers Australia Awards.

Episode List

2013 Australian television seasons